Moondrezhuthu is a 1968 Indian Tamil-language crime film, directed by T. R. Ramanna, produced by T. K. Ramarajan and written by T. N. Balu. Music was by T. K. Ramamoorthy. The film stars Ravichandran, Jayalalithaa, Srividya and Sheela. It was released on 10 May 1968.

Plot 
The film revolves around a chest filled with valuable items and a handful of people competing for it. One character is a greedy old man Rajarathnam Pillai, whose daughter is Selvi. A manager Meganathan is trusted with the chest which needs to be handed over to its legitimate claimants (Pankajam and her suffering family). In his efforts to deliver the box to the rightful owners, he is forced to murder and is sent to jail. His son Maran, to whom he narrates the events, buries the treasure in a village and writes down the clues to find it on three different pieces of paper, with three different Tamil letters, தி (Thi) மு (Mu) and க (Ka).

After many twists and turns, the three villains decipher that the Tamil letters are a clue to the name of the village where the box is buried and they end up going there. Now, the land is in the possession of a factory coming up in its place, and another villain Karmegam also goes after the treasure by killing the others with heavy equipment. How the hero assisted by Nagesh deals with this forms the rest of the story. At the end, the villains are exposed and the box is handed over to its rightful owners. The lovers, Selvi and Maran, are united too.

Cast 
 Ravichandran as Maran
 Jayalalithaa as Selvi
 Srividya as Malathi
 Sheela as Suguna/Meera
 Major Sundarrajan as Meganathan
 Sedhupathy as Ramapathran
 Sriranjani Jr. as Pankajam
 Ennathe Kannaiah as Sukadiya Sett
 C. L. Anandan as Muthu
 R. S. Manohar as Tiger
 S. A. Ashokan as Rajarathnam Pillai
 Ganthimathi as Selvi's mother
 O. A. K. Thevar as Somasundaram
 Nagesh as Appu
 Thengai Srinivasan as Kumar/Sankaran Kutti
 Suruli Rajan as Venkateswara Rao
 Master Prabhakar as Ramapathran's son
 Vasanthi
 Kalavathi

Soundtrack 
Music was composed by T. K. Ramamoorthy and lyrics were written by Kannadasan.

Reception 
Kalki criticised the film for its outdated storyline and lack of originality. Despite this, it became a success.

References

External links 
 

1960s Tamil-language films
1968 crime films
1968 films
Films directed by T. R. Ramanna
Films scored by T. K. Ramamoorthy
Indian crime films